Mangewala is a town of Layyah District in the Punjab province of Pakistan. It is located at 30°54'20N 70°54'40E with an altitude of 133 metres (439 feet).

References

Populated places in Layyah District